Kolkebail Prathapachandra Hiriyanna Shetty is an Indian politician who was the chairman of Karnataka Legislative Council from 12 December 2018 to 4 February 2021. He was a Member of the Karnataka Legislative Council from January 2016.

References

External links
K. Prathapachandra Shetty

1950 births
Living people
Chairs of the Karnataka Legislative Council
Indian National Congress politicians from Karnataka